Jesper Duus (born November 24, 1967) is a Danish former professional ice hockey player who participated at the 2010 IIHF World Championship as a member of the Denmark National men's ice hockey team. He lastly played for Herlev Eagles in Denmark.

Career statistics

References

External links

1967 births
Danish ice hockey coaches
Danish ice hockey defencemen
Edmonton Oilers draft picks
Färjestad BK players
Herlev Hornets players
Hvidovre Ligahockey players
Living people
Modo Hockey players
Rødovre Mighty Bulls players
Sportspeople from Copenhagen
Starbulls Rosenheim players
VEU Feldkirch players